The Stolen Trousers is a 1956 West German comedy film directed by Géza von Cziffra and starring Susanne Cramer, Ruth Stephan and Peter Weck. Emerging comedy star Heinz Erhardt appeared in a supporting role. It was shot at the Göttingen Studios. The film's sets were designed by the art director Ernst Schomer.

Cast
 Susanne Cramer as Edith Martens
 Siegfried Breuer Jr. as Hans Wellner
 Ruth Stephan as Grete Giesemann
 Peter Weck as Toni von Rabenstein
 Margarete Haagen as Tante Amalie
 Oskar Sima as Sebastian Wellner
 Heinz Erhardt as Ferdinand Kofler
 Hubert von Meyerinck as Signore Ricoli
 Beppo Brem as Gendarm
 Lotte Lang as Koechin
 Rudi Hofstätter as Heurigensaenger
 Rudolf Carl as Hausmeister
 Paul Westermeier as Wilhelm Meyer

References

Bibliography 
 Hans-Michael Bock and Tim Bergfelder. The Concise Cinegraph: An Encyclopedia of German Cinema. Berghahn Books, 2009.

External links 
 

1956 films
1956 comedy films
German comedy films
West German films
1950s German-language films
Films directed by Géza von Cziffra
Films set in Vienna
1950s German films
Films shot at Göttingen Studios
German black-and-white films